The 2022 All-Ireland Under-20 Football Championship was the fifth staging of the All-Ireland Under-20 Championship and the 59th staging overall of a Gaelic football championship for players between the minor and senior grades. on 14 May 2022, Tyrone won their sixth title, defeating Kildare in the final.

Results

Connacht Under-20 Football Championship

Quarter-final

Semi-finals

Final

Leinster Under-20 Football Championship

First round

Quarter-finals

Semi-finals

Final

Munster Under-20 Football Championship

Quarter-finals

Semi-finals

Final

Ulster Under-20 Football Championship

First round

Quarter-finals

Semi-finals

Final

All-Ireland Under-20 Football Championship

Semi-finals

Final

Results

References

All-Ireland Under-20 Football Championship
All-Ireland Under-20 Football Championships